Sachsen-Anhalt (F224) is the third ship of the s of the German Navy.

Background 
Sachsen-Anhalt was designed and constructed by ARGE F125, a joint-venture of Thyssen-Krupp and Lürssen.

Construction and career
Sachsen-Anhalt was laid down on 4 June 2014 and launched on 4 March 2016 at Hamburg, Germany. After considerable delay following her launch to repair defects identified during construction she was delivered to the Navy in March 2021. She was commissioned on 17 May 2021.

Gallery

References

External links 
 Seaforces.org

Baden-Württemberg-class frigates
2016 ships
Ships built in Hamburg